These are the full results of the 2022 South American Under-23 Championships in Athletics which took place between September 29 and October 1 at Estádio do Centro Nacional de Treinamento de Atletismo in Cascavel, Brazil.

Men's results

100 meters

Heats – September 29Wind:Heat 1: +2.4 m/s, Heat 2: +2.4 m/s

Final – September 29Wind: +0.5 m/s

200 meters

Heats – September 30Wind:Heat 1: +2.7 m/s, Heat 2: +1.2 m/s

Final – October 1Wind: +1.1 m/s

400 meters

Heats – September 30

Final – September 30

800 meters
September 29

1500 meters
October 1

5000 meters
September 29

10,000 meters
October 1

110 meters hurdles
October 1Wind: +0.8 m/s

400 meters hurdles
September 29

3000 meters steeplechase
September 29

4 × 100 meters relay
September 30

4 × 400 meters relay
October 1

20,000 meters walk
September 30

High jump
September 29

Pole vault
September 29

Long jump
September 30

Triple jump
October 1

Shot put
September 30

Discus throw
September 30

Hammer throw
September 29

Javelin throw
October 1

Decathlon
September 29–30

Women's results

100 meters

Heats – September 29Wind:Heat 1: +1.5 m/s, Heat 2: +1.3 m/s

Final – September 29Wind: +0.5 m/s

200 meters

Heats – September 30Wind:Heat 1: -0.1 m/s, Heat 2: +2.1 m/s

Final – October 1Wind: +1.2 m/s

400 meters
September 30

800 meters
September 29

1500 meters
September 30

5000 meters
September 29

10,000 meters
September 30

100 meters hurdles
October 1Wind: +1.8 m/s

400 meters hurdles
September 29

3000 meters steeplechase
September 29

4 × 100 meters relay
September 30

4 × 400 meters relay
October 1

20,000 meters walk
September 30

High jump
October 1

Pole vault
October 1

Long jump
September 29

Triple jump
October 1

Shot put
September 29

Discus throw
September 30

Hammer throw
September 30

Javelin throw
October 1

Heptathlon
September 29–30

Mixed

4 × 400 meters relay
October 1

References

South American Championships
Events at the South American Under-23 Championships in Athletics